The Men's 77 kg competition at the 2017 World Weightlifting Championships was held on 2 December 2017.

Schedule

Medalists

Records

 Nijat Rahimov's world record was rescinded in 2022.

Results

References

External links
Results 

Men's 77 kg